Justin Smith (born September 30, 1979), nicknamed "the Cowboy", is a former American football defensive end who played in the National Football League (NFL). He played college football at Missouri, where he was an All-American, and was drafted by the Cincinnati Bengals fourth overall in the 2001 NFL Draft. Smith also played for the San Francisco 49ers.

Early years
Smith was born in Jefferson City, Missouri.  He attended Jefferson City High School, where he played high school football for the Jefferson City Jays.

College career
Smith played for the Missouri Tigers football team while majoring in general studies at the University of Missouri. In 1998, he became the first true freshman to start every game for Missouri since 1986 and was named Big 12 Defensive Freshman of the Year. As a sophomore, Smith set a new school sack record with eight and was named to first-team All-Big 12. In his junior season, Smith logged 11 sacks, 24 tackles-for-loss, and 97 total tackles. He broke his own sacks record that he set the previous year and set a new school record for tackles-for-loss. He earned first-team All-America honors from the Football Writers Association of America and garnered first-team All-Big 12 honors for the second year in a row. He entered the 2001 NFL Draft following his junior year.

Professional career

Cincinnati Bengals
Justin was drafted by the Cincinnati Bengals in first round (fourth overall) of the 2001 NFL Draft. He signed with the team on September 8, following protracted contract negotiations, and had roster exemption for the September 9 season opener vs. New England. He signed a six-year, $10 million contract that included a $1.25 million signing bonus. Despite missing all of the preseason as well as the first regular-season game, Smith logged a Bengals rookie-record 8.5 sacks, breaking the mark of 8.0 set by James Francis in 1990. He finished second on the line in total tackles (53) and first in solos (41) and had the second-most sacks by an NFL rookie in 2001, topped only by the 9.0 of Pittsburgh’s Kendrell Bell.

In his second season with the Bengals, he started every game at right defensive end and led the team in both sacks (6.5) and sack yardage (56) while also leading the defensive line in tackles (59). He played 95.5 percent of the defensive snaps (934 of 978), second on the team. His 6.5 sacks, gave him a total of 15 over his first two seasons, the most by a Cincinnati Bengal in his first two seasons since 1976-77.

In his third season with the Bengals, he recorded 60 tackles, 41 of which were solo. He also added another 5.0 sacks while also playing outside linebacker.

His fourth season saw him lead the team in sacks (8.0) and sack yardage (70.5). He also led the defense in snaps played (94.4 percent), and he recorded 70 tackles.

In 2005, Smith led the team once again in sacks (6.0), making it his third time to lead the team in his five seasons. In his other two seasons, he finished one sack or less behind the team leader. By the end of his fifth year, he had moved into fifth place on Bengals all-time sacks list with a total of 34.

On February 15, 2007, the Bengals designated the franchise tag on him. He signed the one-year franchise contract that earned him $8.64 million in 2007. He led the league in assisted tackles in 2007 with 29.

San Francisco 49ers

On March 1, 2008, he signed a six-year, $45 million deal with the San Francisco 49ers. The deal included an $11 million signing bonus. In his first season with San Francisco, Smith registered 7 sacks, 73 tackles and one interception.

Smith was selected for five consecutive Pro Bowls from 2009 to 2013. In 2011 and 2012, he was named to the Associated Press All-Pro team both as a Defensive End and as a Defensive Tackle. He was eligible for the honor at both positions because the 49ers used him as a defensive end in their 3-4 base defense, while frequently moving him inside to DT for their 4-2 nickel defense. He had been mentioned by many pundits as a candidate to win the 2011 NFL Defensive Player of the Year Award, and finished third with 6 out of 50 votes.

At the end of the 2012 season, Smith and the 49ers appeared in Super Bowl XLVII. In the game, he had three combined tackles as the 49ers fell to the Baltimore Ravens by a score of 34–31.

Smith appeared on the NFL Top 100 Players of 2012, and was projected by his peers to be the 17th best player coming into the 2012 season.

On May 18, 2015, Smith announced that he had decided to retire after 14 seasons in the NFL.

NFL statistics

Personal life
Smith is originally from the town of Holts Summit, Missouri, which is near Jefferson City, the state capital. He earned All-State honors and was two-time all-district football choice at Jefferson City High School. While at JCHS, he was selected to SuperPrep's All-American and Top 50 teams as a senior. He is the owner of Railwood Golf Club in central Missouri.

References

External links

San Francisco 49ers bio

1979 births
Living people
Sportspeople from Jefferson City, Missouri
Players of American football from Missouri
American football defensive ends
American football linebackers
Missouri Tigers football players
Cincinnati Bengals players
San Francisco 49ers players
Unconferenced Pro Bowl players
National Conference Pro Bowl players
Ed Block Courage Award recipients